The Sioux City Public Library (Smith Villa Branch) is a historic building located in Sioux City, Iowa, United States.  Local architect William L. Steele designed the Prairie School-style building, which was completed in 1927.  This was long after the style was no longer fashionable in its native Chicago, but it shows its staying power in other areas of the Midwest.  The building is identical to the former Fairmount Branch, which was built the same year.  The Smith Villa Branch was listed on the National Register of Historic Places in 1983.  The building now houses a Head Start program.

References

Library buildings completed in 1927
Buildings and structures in Sioux City, Iowa
National Register of Historic Places in Sioux City, Iowa
Libraries on the National Register of Historic Places in Iowa
Prairie School architecture in Iowa
William L. Steele buildings
Former library buildings in the United States
1927 establishments in Iowa